John McDermott Loxton Menzies (23 November 1889 – 15 May 1972) was an Australian rules footballer who played with St Kilda in the Victorian Football League (VFL).

Notes

External links 

1889 births
1972 deaths
Australian rules footballers from Melbourne
St Kilda Football Club players
People from Brighton, Victoria